The 2020–21 Tennessee Volunteers basketball team represented the University of Tennessee during the 2020–21 NCAA Division I men's basketball season. The team was led by sixth-year head coach Rick Barnes, and played their home games at Thompson–Boling Arena in Knoxville, Tennessee as a member of the Southeastern Conference. They finished the season 18-9, 10-7 in SEC Play to finish in 4th place. They defeated Florida in the quarterfinals of the SEC tournament before losing in the semifinals to Alabama. They received an at-large bid to the NCAA tournament where they were upset in the First Round by Oregon State.

Previous season 
The Volunteers finished the 2019–20 season 17–14, 9–9 in SEC play to finish in eighth place. They were set to take on Alabama in the second round of the SEC tournament. However, the remainder of the SEC Tournament was canceled amid the ongoing COVID-19 pandemic. All further postseason tournaments were likewise canceled.

Offseason

2020 recruiting class

Preseason

SEC media poll
The SEC media poll was released on November 12, 2020.

Preseason All-SEC teams
The Volunteers had two players selected to the preseason all-SEC teams.

First Team

John Fulkerson

Second Team

Yves Pons

Roster

Schedule and results
Due to the ongoing COVID-19 pandemic, the start of the season was pushed back from the scheduled start of November 10. On September 16, 2020, the NCAA announced that November 25 would be the new start date. 

On November 23, it was announced that head coach Rick Barnes had tested positive for COVID-19 and that the school had paused all basketball activities while further tests were conducted within the program.
|-
!colspan=12 style=|Non-conference regular season

|-
!colspan=12 style=|SEC regular season

|-
!colspan=12 style=| SEC Tournament

|-
!colspan=12 style=| NCAA tournament

Source

Rankings

^Coaches did not release a Week 1 poll.

References

Tennessee Volunteers basketball seasons
Tennessee Volunteers
Volunteers basketball
Volunteers basketball
Tennessee